Viburnum tridentatum is a species of plant in the Adoxaceae family. It is endemic to Peru.

References

Endemic flora of Peru
tridentatum
Vulnerable plants
Taxonomy articles created by Polbot